Beverly Beaver may refer to:

 Bev Beaver (athlete) (born 1947), Mohawk Canadian athlete
 Beverly Barton (1946–2011), American author born Beverly Marie Beaver